The Electoral Service is the organ of the state that arranges and supervises elections in Chile. Among its functions is also the maintenance of an electoral archive. Its current councellors are Andrés Tagle Domínguez, Alfredo Joignant, María Cristina Escudero Illanes, Pamela Figueroa Rubio and David Huina Valenzuela. Tagle Domínguez presides the council. The councellors are named by the President of Chile in agreement with the Senate.

References

Elections in Chile